Theodore Carroll Marcuse (August 2, 1920 – November 29, 1967) was an American character actor who appeared frequently on television in the 1950s and 1960s, often portraying villains.

Early years
Marcuse was born in Seattle, Washington to Margaret and Theodore M. Marcuse, a World War I veteran and co-owner of Klementis-Marcuse, Co., fur retailer.

After growing up in San Francisco, he studied dramatic arts at Stanford University and was active in theatrical productions there. Later he received a master's degree in classical literature from Stanford.

Military service 
Marcuse served with the Navy during World War II and was awarded a Silver Star, Bronze Star Medal, and a Presidential Unit Citation for his heroism while serving as a lieutenant on the famed submarine USS Tirante. Other officers on board included future Massachusetts governor Endicott Peabody and author Edward L. Beach, Jr., who wrote the submarine classic Run Silent, Run Deep.

Career 
Marcuse's love for William Shakespeare's plays led to a desire to act on the stage. He trained under Guthrie McClintic in his theatre company, along with Charlton Heston, and appeared on Broadway with Katharine Cornell, Maurice Evans and others. In 1948-1949, he toured nationally for nine months in a production of Medea.

On television he appeared on many series, including The Beverly Hillbillies, Voyage to the Bottom of the Sea, The Wild Wild West, Have Gun – Will Travel, Bonanza, Hogan's Heroes (the 1967 episode "The Hostage", as General von Heiner, filmed not long before his fatal car accident, first airing two and a half weeks after his death), Batman, Star Trek (episode "Catspaw", first airing the week of Halloween in 1967, one month before his death), The Time Tunnel, I Spy, The Monkees, Perry Mason, Peter Gunn, The Untouchables, The Twilight Zone episodes "The Trade-Ins" and "To Serve Man", and The Man from U.N.C.L.E. episodes "The Re-collectors Affair," "The Minus-X Affair," and "The Pieces of Fate Affair".  His film career included roles in The Two Little Bears (1961), Hitler (1962, as Julius Streicher), A Tiger Walks (1964), The Cincinnati Kid (1965), Mara of the Wilderness (1965), Harum Scarum (1965), The Last of the Secret Agents? (1966), The Wicked Dreams of Paula Schultz (1968) and The Picasso Summer (1969).

Death 
Marcuse died in a traffic accident in Hollywood, Los Angeles, California, at the age of 47. He was buried in Golden Gate National Cemetery in San Bruno, California.

Partial filmography

The Desperate Women (1954) - Arzt
The 27th Day (1957) - Col. Gregor (uncredited)
Jeanne Eagels (1957) - Dr. Richards (uncredited)
Have Gun - Will Travel (1957-1959) -  General Beauregard Grock / Wally / Folger /Bartender
Operation Eichmann (1961) - Captain Felsner
The Two Little Bears (1961) - Janos
Hitler (1962) - Julius Streicher
For Love or Money (1963) - Artist
Sands of Beersheba (1964) - Nuri
A Tiger Walks (1964) - Josef Pietz
Mara of the Wilderness (1965) - Felix 
Harum Scarum (1965) - Sinan
The Wild Wild West (1966) - Dr. Vincent Kirby
The Last of the Secret Agents? (1966) - Zoltan Schubach
The Glass Bottom Boat (1966) - Gregor - Spy with Cigar (uncredited)
Hogan's Heroes (1967, TV Series) - The Hostage
The Wild Wild West (1967) - Abdul Hassan
The Wicked Dreams of Paula Schultz (1968) - Owl 
Star Trek (1967) - episode "Catspaw" - Korob
The Picasso Summer (1969) - The Host (final film role)
The Monkees - episode "Royal Flush" - Archduke Otto

References

External links
 
 
 
 
 Theodore Marcuse: Character Actor Cut Down In His Prime at Invisible Themepark

1920 births
1967 deaths
Male actors from Seattle
Military personnel from Seattle
Stanford University alumni
Recipients of the Silver Star
United States Navy officers
United States Navy personnel of World War II
Road incident deaths in California
20th-century American male actors